The 39th Annual Japan Record Awards took place on December 31, 1997, starting at 6:30PM JST. The primary ceremonies were televised in Japan on TBS.

Award winners 
Japan Record Award:
Tetsuya Komuro (producer) & Namie Amuro for "Can You Celebrate?"
Best Vocalist:
Mitsuko Nakamura
Best New Artist:
Rina Chinen for "Precious Delicious"
Best Album:
Glay for "BELOVED"

External links
Official Website

Japan Record Awards
Japan Record Awards
Japan Record Awards
Japan Record Awards
1997